CRI Malakula at 106 FM is a radio station in Malakula, Vanuatu. It is part of China Radio International.  It broadcasts primarily in English.
The CRI programme schedule includes the following:
The Hot Pot Show hosted by DJ Duggy Day
China Now program hosted by Man Lin & Tim.

References

External links
 Official website of 102 FM in Vila and Santo, 106 FM in Malakula

Radio stations in Vanuatu
China Radio International